The 2024 New Hampshire gubernatorial election will be held on November 5, 2024, to elect the Governor of New Hampshire, concurrently with the 2024 U.S. presidential election, as well as elections to the United States Senate, elections to the United States House of Representatives, and various state and local elections. Because New Hampshire does not have gubernatorial term limits in its Constitution, incumbent Republican governor Chris Sununu will be eligible to run for re-election for a historic fifth term in 2024.

Republican primary

Candidates

Potential
Kelly Ayotte, former U.S. Senator
Don Bolduc, retired U.S. Army brigadier general, nominee for U.S. Senate in 2022 and candidate in 2020
Chuck Morse, former president of the New Hampshire Senate, former acting governor, and candidate for U.S. Senate in 2022
Kevin Smith, former state representative, former Londonderry town manager, candidate for governor in 2012, and candidate for U.S. Senate in 2022
Chris Sununu, incumbent governor

Democratic primary

Candidates

Potential
Annie Kuster, U.S. Representative for New Hampshire's 2nd congressional district
Chris Pappas, U.S. Representative for New Hampshire's 1st congressional district
Tom Sherman, former state senator and nominee for governor in 2022
Cinde Warmington, New Hampshire Executive Councilor
Joyce Craig, Mayor of Manchester, New Hampshire

Declined
Steve Marchand, former mayor of Portsmouth and candidate for governor in 2016 and 2018

General election

Predictions

References

New Hampshire gubernatorial elections
Gubernatorial
New Hampshire